Jinyun railway station is a railway station in Jinyun County, Lishui, Zhejiang, China. It is an intermediate stop on the Jinhua–Wenzhou railway. It is used for both passengers and freight.

See also
Jinyun West railway station

References 

Railway stations in Zhejiang
Railway stations in China opened in 2021
Jinyun County
Buildings and structures in Lishui